Chakkara Viyugam: The Battle of Brains ( Wheel Strategy) is a 2008 Indian Tamil-language  drama film starring Natarajan Subramaniam, Jayasurya, and Daisy Bopanna. It is directed by Udhayabhanu Maheswaran. The film released in April 2008.

Cast
 Natarajan Subramaniam as Kanna
 Jayasurya as Inspector Sathish Mishra
 Daisy Bopanna as Sandhya
 Anandsami
 Raaghav as Bose
 Vijay Raj
 Nellai Siva as Police officer
 Shankar as Kanna's friend
 K. Subash

Production 
Natarajan Subramaniam and the crew of Naalai (2006) collaborated for a second time for this film The film was shot in Chennai and Kolkata. The film is produced by Shree Ashtavinayak Cine Vision, who previously produced Jab We Met (2007), which featured Subramaniam as the cinematographer. Daisy Bopanna was cast as the heroine.

Soundtrack 
Songs by Karthik Raja and lyrics written by Snehan.
"Idyatha Kaanam" - Bela Shende, Karthik Raja
"Padaithal… Kaathal" - Karthik Raja, Snehan
"Idhu Thaan Chakraviyugam" - Bhavatharini
"Neer Aadiduvoom" - Karthik, Sangeetha Rajeshwaran, Snehan, Kanishka
"Yei… Unnidam" - Saindhavi, Karthik Raja

Release 
Sify gave the film a rating of two out of five stars and stated that "No two ways about it, the film is an unmitigated endurance test".

References

External links

2008 films
2008 drama films
Indian drama films
2000s Tamil-language films
Films scored by Karthik Raja